The 2017–18 St. Bonaventure Bonnies men's basketball team represented St. Bonaventure University during the 2017–18 NCAA Division I men's basketball season. The Bonnies, led by 11th-year head coach Mark Schmidt, played their home games at the Reilly Center in Olean, New York as members of the Atlantic 10 Conference. They finished the season 26–8, 14–4 in A-10 play to finish in second place. They defeated Richmond in the quarterfinals of the A-10 tournament before losing in the semifinals to Davidson. They received one of the last four at-large bids to the NCAA tournament where they defeated UCLA in the First Four before losing in the first round to Florida.

Previous season 
The Bonnies finished the 2016–17 season 20–12, 11–7 in A-10 play to finish in fifth place. They received the fifth seed in the A-10 tournament where they defeated UMass in the second round to advance to the quarterfinals, where they lost to Rhode Island. The Bonnies did not participate in a postseason tournament.

Offseason

Departures

Incoming transfers

2017 recruiting class

Preseason 
In a poll of the league’s head coaches and select media members at the conference's media day, the Bonnies were picked to finish second in the A-10. Seniors Jaylen Adams and Matt Mobley were named to the conference's preseason first team.

Roster

Schedule and results 

|-
!colspan=9 style=|  Exhibition

|-
!colspan=9 style=|  Non-conference regular season

|-
!colspan=12 style=| <span style=>Atlantic 10 regular season

|-
!colspan=9 style=| Atlantic 10 tournament

|-
!colspan=9 style=| NCAA tournament
|-

References

St. Bonaventure Bonnies men's basketball seasons
St. Bonaventure
St. Bonaventure